StartOut is a nonprofit organization supporting lesbian, gay, bisexual, transgender, and queer (LGBTQ) entrepreneurs.

The organization was founded in 2009 and has over 18,000 members attending its events in eight chapter cities: San Francisco, Los Angeles, New York City, Austin, Chicago, Washington, D.C., Atlanta and Denver.

See also 
 LGBT culture in San Francisco
 List of LGBT-related organizations and conferences
 List of LGBT rights organizations in the United States

References

External sources
Official web site
New Group Addresses Out-Gay  Entrepreneurs, EDGE Boston

Entrepreneurship organizations
LGBT business organizations
LGBT organizations in the United States